A circular linhay is an ancient type of structure found in England, particularly associated with Devon. Linhay (rhymes with finny), also spelled linny, is a type of farm building with an open front and usually a lean-to roof. In Newfoundland English a linney is similar as a storage space, kitchen, or porch but as an addition to the rear of a house, and in American English it is an open, lean-to shed attached to a farmyard. Linhays were used to store hay above and shelter cattle (cattle linhay) or farm machinery (cart linhay).

See also
 Linhay in

References

Agricultural buildings in England
Round buildings